This list of listed buildings in Brønderslev Municipality lists listed buildings in Brønderslev Municipality, Denmark.

The list

External links

 Danish Agency of Culture Ref

 
Brønderslev